The 2019 Coastal Carolina Chanticleers football team represented Coastal Carolina University during the 2019 NCAA Division I FBS football season. The Chanticleers were led by first-year head coach Jamey Chadwell and played their home games at Brooks Stadium. They competed as a member of the East Division of the Sun Belt Conference.

Previous season
They finished the 2018 season 5–7, 2–6 in Sun Belt play to finish in fourth place in the East Division. The 2018 season was the last for head coach Joe Moglia.

Schedule

Schedule Source:

Personnel

Coaching staff

Game summaries

Eastern Michigan

at Kansas

Norfolk State

at UMass

at Appalachian State

Georgia State

at Georgia Southern

Troy

Louisiana

at Arkansas State

at Louisiana–Monroe

Texas State

References

Coastal Carolina
Coastal Carolina Chanticleers football seasons
Coastal Carolina Chanticleers football